Torben Grut (2 June 1871  - 24 December 1945) was a Swedish architect.

Biography
Torben Andreas Grut was born at Tuns parish in Skaraborg County, Sweden. Grut studied at the KTH Royal Institute of Technology in Stockholm. From 1894, Grut was employed by the Danish architect Hans Jørgen Holm. At the same time, he also became a student at the
Royal Danish Academy of Fine Arts. From 1893 to 1896, he was associated with Isak Gustaf Clason and from 1898-1899 was employed by Ferdinand Boberg.

In 1906, he designed Solliden Palace, the summer residence of the Swedish Royal Family. He designed Stockholm Olympic Stadium in 1912.

Torben  was the Swedish champion in tennis 1896-1897 and a member of the Danish IOC 1906-1912. His son William Grut (1914–2012) won the Gold Medal in the modern pentathlon at the 1948 Summer Olympics.

References

1871 births
1945 deaths
Swedish architects
KTH Royal Institute of Technology alumni